Operation Snowcap (1987–1995), launched in the spring of 1987, was a counter-narcotics operation conducted by the Drug Enforcement Administration (DEA), BORTAC (U.S. Border Patrol Tactical Unit) and military/police forces in nine Latin American countries. Operation Snowcap followed Operation Blast Furnace, a four month operation that started in July 1986, which deployed 160 Army personnel and six Blackhawk helicopters to assist Bolivia in operations against cocaine laboratories in the Beni and Santa Cruz regions of Bolivia. At an annual cost to the DEA of $80 million, and involving approximately 140 agents at its onset, Snowcap was the largest counter-narcotics operation that had been launched in Latin America. The U.S. Department of Defense leased 6 UH-1 Huey helicopters, and provided flight training to Bolivian air force pilots and Special Forces training for UMOPAR and DEA agents.  Operation Snowcap recruited U.S. Army infantry officers attending the Army Infantry Officer's advanced course in the late 1980s.  Senior lieutenants and captains attending the course were given classified briefings attempting to recruit them from the Army to participate for operations in Bolivia and Peru.

In late 1987, Clandestine Laboratory and Chemical Program Czar, Gene R. Haislip, Deputy Assistant Administrator of DEA and Douglas A. Snyder, frequent Snowcap operative, convinced high level DEA officials that change was needed in the Snowcap program. They successfully lobbied DEA brass, David Westrate, Terry Burke and Chuck Guttenson, for Frank E. White, Chief of DEA Special Training, to become the new head of Snowcap because of his breadth of military experience and no-nonsense law enforcement perspective. The top brass accepted their recommendations. In one incident in a remote jungle location, DEA Operatives White and Snyder, and Navy Seals R. Gonzales and Red Hernandez were cornered by several dozen local campesinos wielding machetes and the team barely escaped harm by boarding an air transport provided by DEAs Addison Air Wing. In a 1988 memo, White, as new head of Snowcap, charged that agents were not being given adequate support for their mission, warning that without immediate changes, "DEA agents are going to agonize along through an excruciating death on an isolated jungle floor." DEA brass supported his request for more U.S. Military special forces assistance to field DEA agents deployed under Snowcap, with the additional deployment of  Navy SEALS/medics.  However, Frank White never thought the level of support was adequate to protect deployed DEA agents in such remote jungle locations, but trudged forward.

On May 20, 1989, tragedy struck when a US or Peruvian-owned Cessna 208 Caravan that had left Tingo María, in the Peruvian Amazonian highlands, on a DEA coca eradication mission taking place in the context of Operation Snowcap, crashed into Mount Huacranacro, 100 km (62.5 mls) east of Huaral. The nine occupants, six Americans and three Peruvians, were killed. The plane may have suffered an engine failure.
After Operation Just Cause U.S. Army added an additional element of soldiers from an Airborne Unit in Panama to assist in helping with this mission. A small group of soldiers were sent to areas in Columbia and Peru to recon and help target drug facilities. They also acted in supporting roles as security for agents when engaging in their narcotic stings. This unit provided this additional support until mid-1990 when it was deemed that their engagement was overtaxing the unit's other mission in the region.

By the end of 1990, Colombian National Police participating in Operation Snowcap had seized 53 metric tons of cocaine, arrested about 7,000 suspected traffickers, destroyed over 300 processing facilities, and seized over 700,000 gallons of precursor chemicals. Snowcap was successful in temporarily reducing the amount of Colombian cocaine entering the United States, however, it ended up handing control of narco-trafficking from the powerful Medellín and Cali cartels over to the smaller Mexican cartels. According to the SAC who was in charge of Operation Snowcap, Tony Laza, the DEA's "success with Medellín and Cali essentially set the Mexicans up in business, at a time when they were already cash-rich thanks to the budding methamphetamine trade in Southern California."

On 27 August 1994, tragedy struck again when a DEA CASA 212 Aviocar light transport aircraft (reg. N119CA) crashed into a mountain (or at the end of a box canyon) north of Puerto Pizana, in the Amazonian jungle department of San Martín, Peru. The crash reportedly happened while on a flight from Santa Lucia to Pucallpa, in the Huallaga River Valley region, and apparently owed to bad weather and low visibility (rainy and foggy) conditions during a reconnaissance operation. The plane's five occupants, DEA Special Agents Frank S. Wallace, Jay W. Seale, Juan C. Vars, Meredith Thompson, and Frank Fernandez Jr., were killed. This crash, plus a new focus in the Andean counter-narcotics strategy by the newly inaugurated Clinton administration (supported by Congress), and reduced funding by the new DEA administration of Thomas A. Constantine, eventually led to the end of Operation Snowcap in 1995.

See also
 Colombian conflict (1964–present)
 Mexican Drug War

References

Bibliography
 

Drug Enforcement Administration operations
Operations against organized crime